Harriet Lerner (born November 30, 1944), is a clinical psychologist best known for her contributions to psychoanalytic concepts regarding family and feminist theory and therapy, and for her many psychology books written for the general public. From 1972 to 2001, she was a staff psychologist at the Menninger Clinic in Topeka, Kansas, and a faculty member and supervisor at the Karl Menninger School of Psychiatry. During this time she published extensively on the psychology of women and family relationships, revising traditional psychoanalytic concepts to reflect feminist and family systems perspectives.

Education
Lerner did her undergraduate work at the University of Wisconsin, where she received a government grant to study and pursue independent research in Delhi, India. She received her M.A. in Educational Psychology from Teachers College of Columbia University and her Ph.D. in Clinical Psychology from The City University of New York.  She did her predoctoral internship at Mount Zion Hospital in San Francisco and completed her postdoctoral training at the Menninger Clinic, where she subsequently joined the staff.

Works
Lerner is best known for her general-audience books which provide a framework for understanding and improving family and work relationships.

Lerner has appeared in multiple podcasts, including Brene Brown's podcast, Unlocking Us, where the two discuss "How to Apologize & Why it Matters" in a 2020 two-episode special, based on Lerner's 2017 book, "Why Won't You Apologize?"

The Dance of Anger, a New York Times bestseller that has been translated into more than 35 foreign languages, was the first book published in the United States on the subject of women's anger. Women in Therapy is a compilation of her professional publications related to the psychology of women.

In addition to her scholarly work, she is a children's book author with her sister, Susan Goldhor.

Books
The Dance of Anger, 1985, revised in 2005
Women in Therapy, 1988
The Dance of Intimacy, 1989
The Dance of Deception, 1993
Life Preservers, 1996
The Mother Dance, 1998
The Dance of Connection, 2001
The Dance of Fear, 2004
Marriage Rules, 2012
Why Won't You Apologize, 2017

Children's books
What’s So Terrible About Swallowing An Apple Seed?, 1996
Franny B. Kranny, There’s a Bird in Your Hair!, 2001

Personal life
She is married to Steve Lerner, a psychologist and filmmaker, with whom she has two sons: Matt Lerner, the co-founder of Walk Score, and Ben Lerner, a writer and MacArthur Fellow.

References

21st-century American psychologists
American women psychologists
American feminist writers
American women writers
Graduate Center, CUNY alumni
Teachers College, Columbia University alumni
University of Wisconsin–Madison alumni
Writers from Topeka, Kansas
1944 births
Living people
21st-century American women
20th-century American psychologists